Flight 7 or Flight 007 may refer to:

Western Air Express Flight 7, a 1937 crash of a Western Air Express  Boeing 247B
Pan Am Flight 7, a 1957 crash of a Pan Am Boeing 377 Stratocruiser 10-29
Air France Flight 007, a 1962 crash of an Air France Boeing 707
LOT Polish Airlines Flight 007, a 1980 crash of a LOT Polish Airlines Ilyushin Il-62
Korean Air Lines Flight 007, a 1983 accident in which a Korean Air Lines Boeing 747 was shot down over the near Moneron Island.
Aeroflot Flight 7, a 1985 crash of an Aeroflot Yak-40
Kata Air Transport Flight 007, a 2008 accident where an Antonov An-32 crashed due to an engine malfunction

0007